Switzerland participated in the Eurovision Song Contest 1998 in Birmingham. Gunvor represented Switzerland with the song "Lass ihn". They finished in last place with 0 points.

Before Eurovision

National final 
The final was held at DRS TV Studios in Zürich on 18 December 1997, and was hosted by Sandra Studer. The winner was chosen by regional televoting.

At Eurovision
Heading into the final of the contest, BBC reported that bookmakers ranked the entry 11th out of the 25 entries.

Voting
Switzerland did not receive any points at the 1998 Eurovision Song Contest.

References

1998
Countries in the Eurovision Song Contest 1998
Eurovision